Francesca Ioana Alupei (born 3 January 2003) is a Romanian volleyball player who plays for CSM Alba Blaj.

She competed at the 2018 Girls' U17 Volleyball European Championship, where the Romanian team placed fifth. She also competed at the 2017 Girls' U16 Volleyball European Championship, where Romania ranked seventh.

Achievements
Divizia A1:
Winner (1): 2018

Personal life
She is the daughter of Angela Alupei and Dorin Alupei.

References

External links
CEV profile
O generaţie care promite

2003 births
Living people
Romanian women's volleyball players
Middle blockers